was a Japanese film director and screenwriter of anime. He is known for directing the Animerama film series conceived by Osamu Tezuka. Yamamoto directed ten films between 1962 and 1986. His 1973 film Kanashimi no Belladonna was entered into the 23rd Berlin International Film Festival. Besides film work, Yamamoto also served as screenwriter on the anime television series Space Battleship Yamato and wrote the screenplay for its 1977 film adaptation.

Selected filmography
 Astro Boy (1964) (director, writer) (TV)
 Kimba the White Lion (1966) (director, producer, writer) (TV)
 One Thousand and One Arabian Nights (1969) (director)
 Cleopatra (1970) (director)
 Kanashimi no Belladonna (1973) (director, writer)
 Little Wansa (1973) (director) (TV)
 Space Battleship Yamato (1974-1975) (supervising director, writer) (TV)
 Space Battleship Yamato (1977) (screenplay)
 Odin: Photon Sailer Starlight (1985) (director, screenplay)
 The Sensualist (1991) (screenplay)

References

External links

1940 births
2021 deaths
Anime directors
Japanese film directors
Japanese screenwriters
People from Kyoto Prefecture